Hong Kong cascade frog or Hong Kong torrent frog (Amolops hongkongensis) is a species of true frog from southern coastal China, once thought to be endemic to Hong Kong. Their eggs are laid on rock faces in the splash zones of cascades. In Hong Kong, it is a protected species under Wild Animals Protection Ordinance Cap 170.

Distribution and habitat
Originally described from Tai Mo Shan in Hong Kong, populations are now also known from  Guangdong.  In Hong Kong, the species is found in the New Territories and on Hong Kong Island. It was found in rather small streams in Lung Fu Shan.

Amolops hongkongensis inhabit forest-fringed, small hill streams, particularly those with cascades. Tadpoles have a ventral sucker helping them to maintain their position in the stream. Its habitat is threatened by silviculture, clear-cutting, and dam and other infrastructure construction.

Description
The diameter of its suction discs is 3-4 times the width of the fingers. It contains the tarsal fold and has white velvety nuptial pads on the first fingers.

Gallery

References

External link

Amolops
Frogs of China
Fauna of Hong Kong
Endemic fauna of China
Amphibians described in 1951
Taxa named by Clifford H. Pope
Endangered Fauna of China